Venus Envy could be:
Venus Envy (novel),  by Rita Mae Brown
Venus Envy (album), a 1998 album by the band Diesel Boy
Venus Envy (sex shop), a Canadian sex shop and independent book store
Venus Envy (webcomic), a webcomic